Raccoon Township is one of the fifteen townships of Gallia County, Ohio, United States. As of the 2010 census the population was 2,228, of whom 1,295 lived in the unincorporated portions of the township.

Geography
Located in the northwestern part of the county, it borders the following townships:
Huntington Township - north
Morgan Township - northeast corner
Springfield Township - east
Green Township - southeast corner
Perry Township - south
Madison Township, Jackson County - west
Bloomfield Township, Jackson County - northwest corner

Raccoon Creek forms its eastern border.

Two villages are located in Raccoon Township: Centerville, the smallest village in the county, in the west; and Rio Grande, the second largest village in the county, in the south.

Name and history
It is the only Raccoon Township statewide.

Raccoon Township was organized in 1806. In 1833, the township contained four gristmills, four saw mills, two carding machines, a fulling mill, and two distilleries.

Government
The township is governed by a three-member board of trustees, who are elected in November of odd-numbered years to a four-year term beginning on the following January 1. Two are elected in the year after the presidential election and one is elected in the year before it. There is also an elected township fiscal officer, who serves a four-year term beginning on April 1 of the year after the election, which is held in November of the year before the presidential election. Vacancies in the fiscal officership or on the board of trustees are filled by the remaining trustees.

References

External links
County website

Townships in Gallia County, Ohio
Townships in Ohio